Jenne Magafan (1916–1952) was an American painter and muralist. During her short-lived career, she gained national prominence for her work in the New Deal art program. Her twin sister Ethel Magafan was also a muralist. 

Her 1941 mural Cowboy Dance is located in the Anson, Texas, post office. Her work is also included in the collections of the Smithsonian American Art Museum, the Kirkland Museum of Fine & Decorative Art and the Carnegie Museum of Art.

She died of a brain aneuryism in 1952, aged 36.

References

1916 births
1952 deaths
20th-century American women artists
American muralists
Women muralists
American women painters
20th-century American painters
Section of Painting and Sculpture artists